Kuhoo Garg (born 22 September 1998) is an Indian badminton player.

Achievements

South Asian Games 
Women's doubles

BWF World Tour (1 runner-up) 
The BWF World Tour, which was announced on 19 March 2017 and implemented in 2018, is a series of elite badminton tournaments sanctioned by the Badminton World Federation (BWF). The BWF World Tours are divided into levels of World Tour Finals, Super 1000, Super 750, Super 500, Super 300 (part of the HSBC World Tour), and the BWF Tour Super 100.

Mixed doubles

BWF International Challenge/Series (4 titles, 4 runners-up) 
Women's doubles

Mixed doubles

  BWF International Challenge tournament
  BWF International Series tournament
  BWF Future Series tournament

References

External links
 

Living people
1998 births
Indian female badminton players
South Asian Games gold medalists for India
South Asian Games bronze medalists for India
South Asian Games medalists in badminton